Wet Lake (Jezioro Mokre) is a small lake (0.1 km long, 0.5 km wide) in Poland situated in Kuyavia-Pomerania Voivodeship in Mogileński county in Dąbrowa commune, surrounded with farmland. There are 4 nearby villages: Mokre, Pałucka New Village, Obudno and Dąbrowa (Mogileński county).

Lakes of Poland
Lakes of Kuyavian-Pomeranian Voivodeship